John Galloway Painter AM (born 1932) is an Australian classical cellist. He founded the Australian Chamber Orchestra in 1975, and was Director of the Sydney Conservatorium of Music from 1982 to 1985.

Painter has been associated with arts organisations such as the Music Board and Community Arts Committee of the Australia Council for the Arts, the board of Musica Viva Australia, the Victorian Institute of Colleges, the National Institute of Dramatic Art and the Australian National Academy of Music.

In 1996, Painter was a judge of the Sydney International Piano Competition of Australia. In 2013–14, he was Chair of adjudicators for the inaugural Australian Cello Awards, with the Finals Concert held in Sydney on 30 March 2014.

Awards and honours
In 1981, Painter was made a Member of the Order of Australia for service to music.

Bernard Heinze Memorial Award
The Sir Bernard Heinze Memorial Award is given to a person who has made an outstanding contribution to music in Australia.

! 
|-
| 2002 || John Painter || Sir Bernard Heinze Memorial Award ||  || 
|-

References

External links 
 Australian Cello Awards website
 Australian Cello Awards Adjudicators 2014: John Painter
 Australian Cello Awards Youtube Channel

Australian classical cellists
Members of the Order of Australia
1932 births
Living people
Academic staff of the Sydney Conservatorium of Music